The Vikas (a portmanteau from initials of VIKram Ambalal Sarabhai ) is a family of liquid fuelled rocket engines conceptualized and designed by the Liquid Propulsion Systems Centre in the 1970s. The design was based on the licensed version of the Viking engine with the chemical pressurisation system. The early production Vikas engines used some imported French components which were later replaced by domestically produced equivalents. It is used in the Polar Satellite Launch Vehicle (PSLV) and the Geosynchronous Satellite Launch Vehicle (GSLV) series of expendable launch vehicles for space launch use.

Vikas engine is used to power the second stage of PSLV, boosters and second stage of GSLV Mark I and II and also the core stage of GSLV Mark III. The propellant loading for Vikas engine in PSLV, GSLV Mark I and II is 40 tons, while in GSLV Mark III is 55 tons.

History 
In 1974, Societe Europeenne de Propulsion agreed to transfer Viking engine technology in return for 100 man-years of engineering work from ISRO. The first engine built from the acquired technology was tested successfully in 1985 by Nambi Narayanan and his team at ISRO and named it Vikas.

Technical details

The engine uses up about 40 metric tons of UDMH as fuel and Nitrogen tetroxide (N2O4) as oxidizer with a maximum thrust of 725 kN. An upgraded version of the engine has a chamber pressure of 58.5 bar as compared to 52.5 bar in the older version and produces a thrust of 800 kN. The engine is capable of gimballing.

For launches from 2018 a 6% increased thrust version of the Vikas engine was developed. It was demonstrated on 29 March 2018 in the GSAT 6A launch second stage. It will be used for the four Vikas engines first stage boosters on future missions.

Variants

References

External links
 
 

Rocket engines of India
Rocket engines using hypergolic propellant
Rocket engines using the gas-generator cycle